The 2015 Season Southeast Asia Regional Finals or SEA Finals  was the eighth edition of the Garena Premier League, a Riot Games-organised tournament for League of Legends, the multiplayer online battle arena video game. The SEA Finals  is a fully professional League of Legends league over all of the Southeast Asia region, with 4 teams from 2 countries/areas to determine which team is the best in the region.

Format
 Top 2 teams from 2015 GPL Spring and 2015 GPL Summer.
 If additional teams are needed to reach 4 total teams, they will be added in order of 2015 GPL Summer Split finish.
 Single-elimination bracket.
 Each match is Best of Five.
 Winner qualifies for the 2015 International Wildcard Tournament.

Qualified teams 
4 teams from 2 countries/areas

Participants

Results

Final standings

References

External links
 Official website

2012 establishments in Singapore
Sports leagues in Asia
League of Legends competitions